FC Matanzas is a Cuban football club based in Matanzas. Its home stadium is the 1,000-capacity Estadio Calimete. It last played in the Campeonato Nacional in 2013.

Current squad

References

Matanzas
Matanzas